Microseris laciniata is a species of flowering plant in the family Asteraceae known by the common name cutleaf silverpuffs. It is native to the western United States from Washington to northern California and Nevada, where it grows in forest and grassland habitat.

Description
It is a perennial herb growing up to a meter tall with a branching stem. The plentiful leaves are 10 to 50 centimeters long and variable in shape, with smooth, toothed, or lobed edges. The inflorescence is borne on a tall, erect or curving peduncle. The flower head may be 3 centimeters long when in bud and wide when in bloom, bearing up to 100 or more long yellow ray florets.

The fruit is an achene with a gray or brown body a few millimeters long. At the tip of the body is a large pappus made up of 5 to over 20 long, hairy scales, each of which may exceed one centimeter in length.

There are four Microseris laciniata subspecies.

Uses
The root, though bitter, was used for food by Native Americans of Mendocino. The milky sap was left out in the sun and used as a gum.

External links
Jepson Manual Treatment — Microseris laciniata
USDA Plants Profile: Microseris laciniata
Flora of North America
Microseris laciniata — U.C. Photo gallery

laciniata
Flora of the West Coast of the United States
Flora of California
Flora of Nevada
Flora of Oregon
Flora of the Cascade Range
Flora of the Klamath Mountains
Flora of the Great Basin
Natural history of the California Coast Ranges
Flora without expected TNC conservation status